The 1946–47 National Hurling League was the 16th season of the NHL, an annual hurling competition for the GAA county teams. Limerick won the league, beating Kilkenny by 3-8 to 1-7 in a replay of the final.

National Hurling League

Knock-out stage

Semi-finals

Finals

References

National Hurling League seasons
League
League